Jamides phaseli, the dark cerulean, is a butterfly in the family Lycaenidae. It was described by Gervase Frederick Mathew in 1889. It is found in north-eastern Australia, from Cape York to south-eastern Queensland, as well as in the Northern Territory. It is also present on the Torres Strait Islands.

References

External links

Jamides Hübner, [1819] at Markku Savela's Lepidoptera and Some Other Life Forms. Retrieved June 3, 2017.

Jamides
Butterflies described in 1889